Teunis Sprong (16 February 1889 – 21 January 1971) was a Dutch long-distance runner. He competed in the marathon at the 1924 and 1928 Summer Olympics.

References

External links
 

1889 births
1971 deaths
Athletes (track and field) at the 1924 Summer Olympics
Athletes (track and field) at the 1928 Summer Olympics
Dutch male long-distance runners
Dutch male marathon runners
Olympic athletes of the Netherlands
Athletes from Rotterdam